Vaṭeśvara-siddhānta is a mathematical and astronomical treatise by Vaṭeśvara in India in 904.  This treatise contains fifteen chapters on astronomy and applied mathematics.

Mathematical exercises are included for students to show their comprehension of the text.

References

 K. S. Shukla, "Ancient Indian Mathematical Astronomy Eleven Centuries ago (Vateswara Siddanta of Vateshwaracharya 880 AD)", Indian Institute of Scientific Heritage (IISH)

Indian mathematics